Sir Henry Turner Irving,   (1833–1923) was a British Civil Servant and Colonial Administrator. He first served as acting Governor of British Ceylon. In 1873–1874, he served as Governor of the Leeward Islands. In 1874–1880, he served as Governor of Trinidad. In 1882–1887, he served as Governor of British Guiana.

He was the first Governor of Trinidad to occupy the Government House, now known as the President's House.

He entered the Colonial Office as a clerk in 1854. In 1858, while at the Colonial Office, he served as a special messenger to William Ewart Gladstone who was then the Lord High Commissioner of the Ionian Islands. He then was appointed private secretary to the Permanent Under-Secretary, Sir Frederic Rogers in 1862. In 1865, he was selected to accompany the Governor of Jamaica, John Peter Grant, as Colonial Secretary of that colony.

He married widow Emma Patty Johnson (née Barclay) on 24 June 1884. Lady Irving died in 1903. The couple had no children.

References

External links
Article on Henry Turner Irving in Stabroek News.  Archived in landofsixpeoples.com
Henry Turner Irving in Stabroek News.  Archived in landofsixpeoples.com

1833 births
1923 deaths
Governors of British Guiana
Governors of British Trinidad
Governors of the Leeward Islands
Colonial Administrative Service officers
British colonial governors and administrators in the Americas
Knights Grand Cross of the Order of St Michael and St George
Colonial Secretaries of Jamaica
Chief Secretaries of Ceylon